Jerome Alan West (born May 28, 1938) is an American basketball executive and former player. He played professionally for the Los Angeles Lakers of the National Basketball Association (NBA). His nicknames included "Mr. Clutch", for his ability to make a big play in a clutch situation, such as his famous buzzer-beating 60-foot shot that tied Game 3 of the 1970 NBA Finals against the New York Knicks; "the Logo", in reference to his silhouette being incorporated into the NBA logo;  "Mr. Outside", in reference to his perimeter play with the Los Angeles Lakers; and "Zeke from Cabin Creek", for the creek near his birthplace of Chelyan, West Virginia. West played the small forward position early in his career, and he was a standout at East Bank High School and at West Virginia University, where he led the Mountaineers to the 1959 NCAA championship game. He earned the NCAA Final Four Most Outstanding Player honor despite the loss. He then embarked on a 14-year career with the Los Angeles Lakers, and was the co-captain of the 1960 U.S. Olympic gold medal team, a squad that was inducted as a unit into the Naismith Memorial Basketball Hall of Fame in 2010.

West's NBA career was highly successful. Playing the guard position, he was voted 12 times into the All-NBA First and Second Teams, was elected into the NBA All-Star Team 14 times, and was chosen as the  All-Star MVP in 1972, the same year that he won the only title of his career. West holds the NBA record for the highest points per game average in a playoff series with 46.3. He was also a member of the first five NBA All-Defensive Teams (one second, followed by four firsts), which were introduced when he was 32 years old. Having played in nine NBA Finals, he is also the only player in NBA history to be named Finals MVP despite being on the losing team (1969). In 1980, West was inducted into the Naismith Basketball Hall of Fame and named to the NBA 35th Anniversary Team. West was named as one of the 50 Greatest Players in NBA history in 1996, and to the NBA 75th Anniversary Team in 2021.

After his playing career ended, West took over as head coach of the Lakers for three years. He led Los Angeles into the playoffs each year and earned a Western Conference Finals berth once. Working as a player-scout for three years, West was named general manager of the Lakers before the 1982–83 NBA season. Under his reign, Los Angeles won six championship rings. In 2002, West became general manager of the Memphis Grizzlies and helped the franchise win their first-ever playoff berths. For his contributions, West won the NBA Executive of the Year Award twice, once as a Lakers manager (1995) and then as a Grizzlies manager (2004). West's son, Jonnie, also played college basketball for West Virginia.

Early life
West was born into a poor household in Chelyan, West Virginia. He was the fifth of six children of Cecil Sue West, a housewife, and Howard Stewart West, a coal mine electrician. West's father physically abused him, and West has stated that for a time he slept with a loaded shotgun under his bed out of fear that he might have to kill his father in self-defense.

West was an outgoing and aggressive child in his youth. However, in 1951 his older brother, David, was killed in action in the Korean War, and the trauma turned West into a shy and introverted boy. He was so small, frail, and weak that he needed many vitamin injections from his doctor and was kept apart from children's sports, to prevent him from getting seriously injured. Growing up, West spent his days hunting and fishing, but his main activity was shooting at a basketball hoop that a neighbor had nailed to his storage shed. West spent days shooting baskets from every possible angle, ignoring mud and snow in the backyard, as well as his mother's whippings when he came home hours late for dinner.

West attended East Bank High School in East Bank, West Virginia from 1952 to 1956. During his first year, he was benched by his coach Duke Shaver due to his lack of height. Shaver emphasized the importance of conditioning and defense, which were lessons that the teenager appreciated. West eventually became the team's starting small forward, and he quickly established himself as one of the finest West Virginia high school players of his generation. He was named All-State from 1953 to 1956, then All-American in 1956 when he was West Virginia Player of the Year, becoming the state's first high-school player to score more than 900 points in a season, with an average of 32.2 points per game. West's mid-range jump shot became his trademark and he often used it to score while under pressure from opposing defenses. West led East Bank to a state championship on March 24 that year, prompting East Bank High School to change its name to "West Bank High School" every year on March 24 in honor of their basketball prodigy. This practice remained in effect until the school closed in 1999.

College career

West graduated from East Bank High School in 1956, and more than 60 universities showed interest in him. He eventually chose to stay in his home state and attend West Virginia University (WVU), located in Morgantown. In his freshman year (1956–57), West was a member of the WVU freshman squad that achieved a perfect record of 17 wins without a loss over the course of the season; other team members included Jay Jacobs and Willie Akers. In his first varsity year under head coach Fred Schaus, West scored 17.8 points per game and averaged 11.1 rebounds; he also started in all 28 games while shooting 49.6% from the field and 73.2% from the free throw line. These performances earned him a multitude of honors, among them an All-American Third Team call-up, First Team All-Southern Conference, Southern Conference Tournament Most Valuable Player Award and First Team honors, Chuck Taylor–Converse Second-team All-American honors, and Associated Press and United Press International Third-team All-American honors. The Mountaineers went 26–2 that year, ending the season with a loss to Manhattan College in postseason tournament play.

During his junior year (1958–59), West scored 26.6  points per game and grabbed 12.3  rebounds per game. He tied the NCAA five-game tournament record of 160 points (32.0 points per game) and led all scorers and rebounders in every West Virginia game, including getting 28 points and 11 rebounds in a 71–70 loss to California in the final. West was named Most Outstanding Player of that year's Final Four. Further awards were All-American, Southern Conference Tournament MVP and Southern Conference Player of the Year and Athlete of the Year. He was also named to be a member of the U.S. Pan American Games basketball team that won the gold medal. West demonstrated his tenacity for the game in a match against the Kentucky Wildcats. He broke his nose during an incident in the game, but he continued to play despite intense pain and having to breathe through his mouth. He scored 19 points in the second half, leading WVU to an upset victory.

In his final collegiate season (1959–60) West enjoyed several career highs, such as scoring 29.3 points per game, a 134 season-assists, 16.5 rebounds per game, and a shooting average of 50.4% from the field, 76.6% from the free throw line. He was honored again with several awards: a call-up to the All-American selection, and being voted Southern Conference MVP. West's best performance was a game against Virginia, in which he grabbed 16 rebounds and scored 40 points. Moreover, during that final year, he had 30 double-doubles and fifteen 30-point games. In his collegiate career, West totaled 2,309 points and 1,240 rebounds. He averaged 24.8 points per game and 13.3 rebounds. As of 2011, West holds 12 WVU all-time records. West and Oscar Robertson co-captained the U.S. men's basketball team that won the gold medal at the 1960 Summer Olympics.

Professional career

Los Angeles Lakers (1960–1974)

1960–64: Mr. Inside and Mr. Outside 

West made himself available for the 1960 NBA draft, and he was drafted with the second overall pick by the Minneapolis Lakers, shortly before the team relocated to Los Angeles. West became the first draft pick ever of the relocated franchise. His college coach was also hired to coach the Lakers. He played West as a guard, in contrast to West's college days as a forward. The Lakers were captained by Hall-of-Fame forward Elgin Baylor, who was complemented by centers Jim Krebs and Ray Felix; forwards Rudy LaRusso and Tom Hawkins; and guards Rod Hundley (from West Virginia, like West), Frank Selvy, and Bobby Leonard. This team perennially had strong forwards and guards, but was constantly weak at center, giving them a disadvantage against the Boston Celtics with their Hall-of-Fame center, Bill Russell.

Initially, West felt odd in his new environment. He was a loner. His high-pitched voice earned him the nickname "Tweety Bird", and he spoke with such a thick Appalachian accent that his teammates also referred to him as "Zeke from Cabin Creek" (his nickname acknowledged his country roots, and his accent was so thick that he squeaked his nickname sheepishly – "Zeek from Cab'n Creek"). However, West soon impressed his colleagues with his defensive hustle, with his vertical jump—he could reach up 16  inches above the rim when he went up—and with his work ethic, spending countless extra hours working on his game. On the floor, West scored 17.6 points, grabbed 7.7 rebounds and gave 4.2 assists per game. West won Schaus's trust and, alternating with Hundley, Selvy, and Leonard, played 35 minutes per game and established himself as the Lakers' second scoring option. The NBA commented that the Lakers now had a potent one-two-punch—with "Mr. Inside" (the low-post scorer, Baylor) and "Mr. Outside" (the long-distance shooter, West). These performances soon earned West his first of fourteen NBA All-Star Game call-ups.

West helped the Lakers improve from their previous 25-win season to 36 wins as they reached the 1961 NBA Playoffs. They needed all five games to put away the Detroit Pistons but then lost to the St. Louis Hawks in seven games, losing the final game 105–103.

In West's second NBA season, the Lakers could only make limited use of Baylor, who was called up by the U.S. Army Reserves and could play only 48 games. However, West seamlessly took over the role of team leader and established himself as the main Lakers scorer, averaging 30.8  points, 7.9  rebounds and 5.4  assists per game, winning All-NBA First Team honors. On January 17, 1962, West scored a career-high 63 points in a 129–121 win over the New York Knicks. West became known especially for hitting important late-game shots, and Lakers' announcer Chick Hearn named him "Mr. Clutch" a handle which stuck with West for his entire career.

The Lakers won 54 regular-season games and secured a first-round bye in the 1962 NBA Playoffs. They beat the Pistons four games to two to advance to the 1962 NBA Finals against the Boston Celtics. The teams split the first two games, and at the end of Game 3 in Los Angeles, West tied the game at 115. The Celtics' Sam Jones inbounded the ball at half-court with three seconds left. West stole the ball, raced upcourt, and converted a running layup as the buzzer sounded. The Celtics tied the series in Game 6 at three games apiece, and the teams headed to Boston for Game 7. For most of the game, the Lakers trailed, but West and Frank Selvy hit several clutch baskets and tied the game at 100. Selvy then missed an open 8-foot shot which would have won the Lakers their first title. Baylor's tip-in attempt was thwarted by Sam Jones. In overtime, Jones scored several clutch baskets to ensure a 110–107 win for the Celtics. The 1962 NBA finals would serve as the beginning of the greatest rivalry in NBA history

In the 1962–63 NBA season, Baylor was back full-time. West averaged 27.8  points, 7.0  rebounds and 5.6  assists and was again NBA All-Star and All-NBA First-Team; however, he played in only 55 regular-season games, missing the last seven weeks due to a hamstring injury. Again, the Lakers reached the finals, and again, they battled the Celtics. With West not yet in shape, Baylor and the Lakers fell back 3–2; then they succumbed in Game 6 in front of their home crowd with a 112–109 loss. As the game ended, veteran Celtics playmaker Bob Cousy threw the ball high into the rafters of the L.A. Sports Arena.

In the following 1963–64 NBA season, West became the Lakers' scoring leader for the first time. His 28.7  points per game eclipsed the 25.4 by Baylor, who stated that he suffered from knee problems. The Lakers struggled during the entire season, winning only 42 games, and were beaten  by the Hawks in five games during the first round of the 1964 NBA Playoffs.

1964–68: Leader of the Lakers 

In the following 1964–65 NBA season, West averaged 31.0  points (at the time, a career-high), only surpassed by perennial scoring champion Wilt Chamberlain. After ending the regular season with 49 wins, L.A. played the Baltimore Bullets in the first round of the 1965 NBA Playoffs, but then team captain Baylor suffered a career-threatening knee injury. West spectacularly took over Baylor's leading role, as he scored 49  points and willed the shocked Lakers to the win. In Game 2, Baltimore was unable to stop the Lakers guard, who scored 52  points, nearly half of L.A.'s  total, in the 118–115 win. The Bullets took their two home games, despite West scoring 44 and 48  points respectively, but in the decisive Game 5 in L.A., the guard helped beat the Bullets with 42  points in a close 117–115 win. West averaged 46.3  points per game, a figure that is still an NBA record. However, in the 1965 NBA Finals, the Celtics easily beat the short-handed Lakers, 4–1. In Game 1, which Boston easily won, defensive Celtics guard K. C. Jones kept West to the only 26  points, and in Game 2, West scored 45  points, but Boston still won 129–123. In Game 3, West scored 49 points, and L.A. finally won a game, but in Games 4 and 5, the Lakers were beaten by double digits; in the last quarter of Game 5, West missed 14 of 15 shots and could not prevent yet another Celtics win. Still, the Lakers guard finished the playoffs with 40.6 points per game.

In the 1965–66 NBA season, West averaged a career-best 31.3 points, along with 7.1 rebounds and 6.1 assists per game.  He made an NBA record 840 free throws, and earned yet another pair of All-Star Team and All-NBA First Team nominations. Winning 45 games, the Lakers beat the St. Louis Hawks in a close seven-game series, and yet again met the Boston Celtics in the 1966 NBA Finals. West was assisted by Baylor, who was a self-estimated "75 percent" of his pre-injury self, The two long-standing rivals split the first six games, with West's usual scoring dominance countered by Celtics forward John Havlicek, whose size and speed created serious mismatch problems for the Lakers. In Game 7, West and Baylor shot a combined three of 18 in the first half, and the Lakers fell far behind; L.A. willed themselves back to a close 95–93 with four seconds left, but the Celtics ran the clock out and the Lakers were denied yet again.

The 1966–67 NBA season saw West playing only 66 regular-season games due to injury; his averages fell slightly to 28.0 points, 5.9 rebounds and 6.8 assists per game. The Lakers had a disappointing season, winning only 36 games and getting swept by the San Francisco Warriors in the first round of the 1967 NBA Playoffs. Veteran coach Fred Schaus retired, and Butch Van Breda Kolff took over; under his reign, the Lakers won 52 games in the 1967–68 NBA season in their first season in The Forum. The 52 wins were accumulated despite West playing only 51 regular season games due to injury and scoring 26.3  points, the lowest average since his rookie year: after being a First-Teamer for six times en bloc, he only made the All-NBA Second Team.

In the 1968 NBA Playoffs, the Lakers beat the Chicago Bulls and the Warriors to set up yet another Lakers-Celtics NBA Finals; it was considered a match of size versus speed, as the Lakers had nobody to guard Celtics coach/center Bill Russell or forward John Havlicek close to the basket, but the Celtics in return had difficulties guarding prolific L.A. outside shooters Baylor, West and fellow guard Gail Goodrich. In Game 1, West only hit seven of 24 shots, and the Lakers lost 107–101, but L.A. evened out the series at two games each. But West, who had scored 38  points in a Game 4 win, had sprained his ankle and did not play at full strength the rest of the series. In Game 5, an injured West scored 35 points, but Boston won by three points. In Game 6, Havlicek shredded the Lakers with 40  points, and after yet another Finals loss to Boston, West commented that the Lakers lost two games they should have won: "We gave them the first game, and we gave them the fifth. But I take nothing from them... They're all that way on the Celtics, and you can't teach it."

1968–71: Arrival of Wilt Chamberlain 

On July 9, 1968, the Lakers made a trade that brought reigning NBA Most Valuable Player Wilt Chamberlain of the Philadelphia 76ers to Los Angeles at the beginning of the 1968–69 NBA season. To get the center, the Lakers traded West's backcourt partner Archie Clark, starting center Darrall Imhoff and backup forward Jerry Chambers to Philadelphia. Coach Van Breda Kolff was concerned about the drain at the guard positions after losing Clark, and especially after losing Goodrich in the expansion draft to the Phoenix Suns. He only had diminutive, defensively weak Johnny Egan left next to West. While West himself got on well with the recruit, Chamberlain often argued with team captain Elgin Baylor and had a poor relationship with Van Breda Kolff. Van Breda Kolff pejoratively called Chamberlain "The Load", and later complained that Chamberlain was egotistical, never respected him, too often slacked off in practice and focused too much on his statistics. In return, the center blasted Van Breda Kolff as "the dumbest and worst coach ever". There was an altercation in which Chamberlain was about to punch Van Breda Kolff before Baylor had intervened. West was disturbed by locker room tension; used to playing on teams with good chemistry, his quality of play became erratic, and his scoring average of 25.9 points was his lowest since his rookie season. However, he made the Second Team of the inaugural All-Defensive Team.

In the 1969 NBA Playoffs, the 55-win Lakers defeated the Atlanta Hawks and the San Francisco Warriors, setting up the sixth finals series versus Boston in eight years. Before Game 1, West privately complained to Bill Russell of exhaustion, but then the Lakers guard scored 53  points on Boston in a close two-point win. L.A. also took Game 2, with West scoring 41  points. In Game 3, Russell opted to double-team West, and the guard's exhaustion began to show: West twice asked to be subbed for longer periods, and both times the Lakers fell back by double digits and finally lost by six points. Game 4 saw Celtics guard Sam Jones hit an off-balance buzzer beater to tie the series, but in Game 5, the Lakers struck back and won by 13 points; however, they suffered a major blow when West – who scored 39 points and by far led all players in scoring during the entire series – lunged for a meaningless late-game ball and seriously pulled his hamstring: it was immediately visible that the injury would not heal until the end of the series. A limping West scored 26  points in Game 6, but the Celtics won 99–90 with a strong Bill Russell, who held Chamberlain to only eight  points in the entire game. In Game 7, Lakers owner Jack Kent Cooke had put up thousands of balloons in the rafters of the Forum in Los Angeles. This display of arrogance motivated the Celtics and angered West. The Lakers trailed the entire game and were behind 91-76 after 3 quarters, but powered by a limping West, the Lakers closed the gap to 103–102 with two minutes to go and had the ball. But West committed costly turnovers and L.A. lost the game 108–106 despite a triple-double of 42  points, 13  rebounds and 12  assists from West, who became the only recipient of the NBA Finals Most Valuable Player Award from the losing team. After the loss West was seen as the ultimate tragic hero: after the game, Bill Russell held his hand, and John Havlicek said: "I love you, Jerry".

In the 1969–70 NBA season under new coach Joe Mullaney, the Lakers' season began with a shock when Wilt Chamberlain seriously injured his knee and missed practically the whole regular season. As after Baylor's injury years before, West stepped into the void, leading the NBA in scoring average with 31.2  points per game, and averaging 4.6  rebounds and 7.5  assists per game, earning him his first of four All-Defensive First Team votes and another All-NBA First Team berth after two Second Team years. The Lakers won 46 games, and in the 1970 NBA Playoffs, they narrowly beat the Phoenix Suns in seven games and swept the Hawks in four, setting up the first NBA Finals between the Lakers and the rugged New York Knicks, led by Hall-of-Famers, such as Willis Reed, Dave DeBusschere, Bill Bradley, and Walt Frazier. L.A. and N.Y. split the first two games, with both games respectively decided by centers Reed and the still-hobbling Chamberlain. In Game 3, DeBusschere hit a mid-range jump shot with three seconds left to put the Knicks ahead 102–100, and the Lakers had no time-outs left. Chamberlain inbounded the ball to West, who raced past Walt Frazier and threw up a 60-foot shot. Frazier later commented: "The man's crazy. He looks determined. He thinks it's going in!" West incredibly connected, and this basket was later called one of the greatest moments ever by the NBA. As the three-point line had not been introduced yet, the shot just tied the game. In overtime, West, however, sprained his left hand and missed all five of his shots, and the Knicks won 111–108. In Game 4, the guard scored 37  points and 18  assists, and the Lakers won. However, more frustration awaited West in Game 5, when Reed pulled his thigh muscle and seemed out for the series; instead of capitalizing on a double-digit lead and reeling off an easy win, the Lakers committed 19 second-half turnovers, and the two main scorers Chamberlain and West shot the ball only three and two times, respectively, in the entire second half and lost 107–100 in what was called one of the greatest comebacks in NBA Finals history. After Chamberlain scored 45 points and West 31 points plus 13 assists in a series-equalising 135-113 Lakers win, the Lakers seemed favorites prior to Game 7. However, West had also injured his right hand and received several manual injections, and Reed famously hobbled up court before Game 7: the Knicks center scored the first four points, and inspired his team to one of the most famous playoff upsets of all time. With his injured hands, West still hit nine of his 19 shots, but was outplayed by Walt Frazier, who scored 36 points and 19 assists and was credited with several crucial steals on Lakers guard Dick Garrett.

In the 1970–71 NBA season, the Lakers reacquired Gail Goodrich, who came back from the Phoenix Suns after playing for L.A. until 1968. At age 32, West averaged 26.9 points, 4.6 rebounds and 9.5 assists, and helped the Lakers win 46 games and make the 1971 NBA Playoffs. After losing Elgin Baylor to an Achilles tendon rupture that effectively ended his career, West himself injured his knee and was out for the season; the short-handed Lakers lost the Western Conference Finals in five games to the championship-bound Milwaukee Bucks, who were led by  freshly-crowned Most Valuable Player Lew Alcindor (later known as Kareem Abdul-Jabbar) and veteran Hall-of-Fame guard Oscar Robertson.

1971–74: Late success and twilight years 

Before the 1971–72 NBA season, West was smarting from his frequent injuries and losses and considered retirement. The Lakers hired former Celtics star guard and future Hall-of-Fame coach Bill Sharman as head coach. Although injured captain Elgin Baylor ended his career, the Lakers had a season for the ages. The team was powered by Sharman's emphasis on tough defense and fast break offense, and L.A. embarked on an unprecedented 33 game win streak, en route to a then-record 69 wins in the regular season. West himself contributed with 25.8 points and led the league with a career-high 9.7 assists per game. He was named All-Star, All-NBA and All-Defense First Teamer and voted 1972 All-Star Game MVP.

In the postseason, the Lakers defeated the Chicago Bulls in a four-game sweep, then went on to face the Milwaukee Bucks, and defeated them in six games. In the 1972 NBA Finals, the Lakers again met the New York Knicks. Although West suffered a terrible shooting slump during Games 1 and 2, the Lakers tied the series at one win each, and in Game 3, he scored 21 points and helped L.A. win Game 3. In this game, he now had scored 4,002 playoff points, which set an all-time NBA record. After winning Game 4 due to a superb outing from Wilt Chamberlain, West scored 23  points and dished out 9 assists in Game 5, helping the Lakers to win the game and the NBA championship. The championship was West's first-ever NBA title. West conceded that he had played a terrible series, and credited the team for the success. Years later he said "I played terrible basketball in the Finals, and we won... It was particularly frustrating because I was playing so poorly that the team overcame me. Maybe that's what a team is all about."

Having vanquished this long-time bane, West entered his 13th NBA year. In the 1972–73 NBA season, the main scoring role was taken by Goodrich, and West was now a playmaker instead of a scorer. However, West averaged 22.8 points, but also averaged 8.8 assists per game, and again was a First Teamer in the All-Star, All-NBA, and All-Defense Teams. The Lakers won 60 games and reached the 1973 NBA Finals against the New York Knicks. In-Game 1 West scored 24  points before fouling out with three minutes left and L.A. won Game 1 115–112. However, the Knicks took Games 2 and 3, and West strained both of his hamstrings: in Game 4, the shorthanded Lakers were no match for New York, and in Game 5, the valiant, but injured West and Hairston had miserable games, and despite Chamberlain scoring 23 points and grabbing 21 rebounds, the Lakers lost 102–93 and the series.

The 1973–74 NBA season was to be West's last as a player. Now 36 years old, the veteran guard averaged 20.3 points, 3.7 rebounds and 6.6 assists per game. In two newly introduced statistics, steals and blocks, he was credited with 2.6 steals and 0.7 blocks per game. Despite playing only 31 games due to a strained groin, West was still regarded as an elite guard, earning another call-up into his final All-Star Game. Without Chamberlain, who had ended his NBA career, the Lakers won 47 games and lost in five games to the Milwaukee Bucks. After this loss, West retired due to contract disagreements with Cooke, and filed a suit for unpaid back wages. West wanted to re-negotiate his contract and keep playing, however, he said Cooke "basically told my agent to go to hell. I felt I was deceived. When you feel that you're deceived you don't want any part of the organization that deceived you. I could've played another very good year. Every athlete says that. But I could've, and I knew I could've. But I could never have played for the Lakers again, and I wasn't going to play for anybody else." At the time of his departure, West had scored more points than any other Laker in franchise history.

Coaching career

Los Angeles Lakers (1976–1979) 
Lakers owner Jack Kent Cooke was known for a keen eye identifying leadership and teaching qualities (he also gave Hall of Famers Sparky Anderson and Joe Gibbs their first managerial/head coaching positions), and asked West to coach and participate in player personnel decisions. In the 1976–77 season, West became coach of the Los Angeles Lakers. In three years, he led the Lakers and star center Kareem Abdul-Jabbar to a 145–101 record, making the playoffs all three seasons and reaching the Western Conference Finals in 1977.

Executive career

Los Angeles Lakers (1979–2000) 
After his coaching stint, West worked as a scout for three years before becoming general manager of the Lakers before the 1982–83 seasons. West helped to build the great 1980s Lakers dynasty, also known as Showtime, which brought five championship rings (1980, 1982, 1985, 1987, and 1988) to Los Angeles.

Those championship-winning Lakers were coached by Pat Riley, and featured superstar players Magic Johnson, Kareem Abdul-Jabbar and James Worthy. After a slump in the early 1990s, West rebuilt the team of coach Del Harris around center Vlade Divac, forward Cedric Ceballos, and guard Nick Van Exel, which won 48 games, and went to the Western Conference Semifinals. In 1995, West received his first Executive of the Year Award for his role in turning the Lakers around.

West continued to propel the Lakers to championship contender status by trading Divac for the draft rights to Kobe Bryant (1996), by signing free agent center Shaquille O'Neal (also 1996), and by signing six-time NBA champion Phil Jackson as a coach (1999). West departed from the Lakers at the end of the 1999-2000 season. However, he laid down the foundation of the Lakers three-peat, which saw L.A. win three NBA titles from 2000-2002.

Memphis Grizzlies (2002–2007) 
In 2002, West became the general manager of the Memphis Grizzlies. He explained his decision with the desire for exploring something new: "After being a part of the Laker's success for so many years, I have always wondered how it would be to build a winning franchise that has not experienced much success. I want to help make a difference." West's Memphis stint was not as spectacular as his Los Angeles stint, but he turned a franchise which was about to be sold into a reliable playoffs team, making few trades but getting the maximum from the players he had available (such as Pau Gasol, James Posey and Jason Williams) and signing coach Hubie Brown, who became Coach of the Year in 2004. West himself won his second NBA Executive of the Year Award in the same year. At age 69, West retired as a Grizzlies general manager in 2007 and turned over managing duties to Chris Wallace.

Golden State Warriors (2011–2017) 
On May 19, 2011, West joined the Golden State Warriors as an executive board member, reporting directly to new owners Joe Lacob and Peter Guber. This role also came with an undisclosed minority ownership stake in the team. In 2015, the Warriors won their first championship in 40 years; the championship was the seventh earned by West while serving as a team executive. He earned his eighth in the 2016–17 season.

Los Angeles Clippers (2017–present) 
After helping the Golden State Warriors win the championship against the Cleveland Cavaliers, on June 14, 2017, West announced that he would go to the Los Angeles Clippers as an executive board member and consultant. Clippers coach, Doc Rivers, floated the idea of West joining the organization during the 2016 season. West referred to leaving Golden State as "one of the saddest days of his life," but was excited to find a new challenge.

Kawhi Leonard recruiting controversy 

On December 17, 2020, it was reported that West and the LA Clippers were under investigation by the NBA following a lawsuit filed by John Wilkes against the LA Clippers over the recruitment of Kawhi Leonard to the team.

NBA career statistics

Regular season 

|-
| style="text-align:left;"| 
| style="text-align:left;"|L.A. Lakers
| style="background:#cfecec;"|79* || – || 35.4 || .419 || – || .666 || 7.7 || 4.2 || – || – || 17.6
|-
| style="text-align:left;"| 
| style="text-align:left;"|L.A. Lakers
| 75 || – || 41.2 || .445 || – || .769 || 7.9 || 5.4 || – || – || 30.8
|-
| style="text-align:left;"| 
| style="text-align:left;"|L.A. Lakers
| 55 || – || 39.3 || .461 || – || .778 || 7.0 || 5.6 || – || – || 27.1
|-
| style="text-align:left;"| 
| style="text-align:left;"|L.A. Lakers
| 72 || – || 40.4 || .484 || – || .832 || 6.0 || 5.6 || – || – || 28.7
|-
| style="text-align:left;"| 
| style="text-align:left;"|L.A. Lakers
| 74 || – || 41.4 || .497 || – || .821 || 6.0 || 4.9 || – || – || 31.0
|-
| style="text-align:left;"| 
| style="text-align:left;"|L.A. Lakers
| 79 || – || 40.7 || .473 || – || .860 || 7.1 || 6.1 || – || – || 31.3
|-
| style="text-align:left;"| 
| style="text-align:left;"|L.A. Lakers
| 66 || – || 40.5 || .464 || – || .878 || 5.9 || 6.8 || – || – || 28.7
|-
| style="text-align:left;"| 
| style="text-align:left;"|L.A. Lakers
| 51 || – || 37.6 || .514 || – || .811 || 5.8 || 6.1 || – || – || 26.3
|-
| style="text-align:left;"| 
| style="text-align:left;"|L.A. Lakers
| 61 || – || 39.2 || .471 || – || .821 || 4.3 || 6.9 || – || – || 25.9
|-
| style="text-align:left;"| 
| style="text-align:left;"|L.A. Lakers
| 74 || – || 42.0 || .497 || – || .824 || 4.6 || 7.5 || – || – ||style="background:#cfecec;"| 31.2*
|-
| style="text-align:left;"| 
| style="text-align:left;"|L.A. Lakers
| 69 || – || 41.2 || .494 || – || .832 || 4.6 || 9.5 || – || – || 26.9
|-
| style="text-align:left;background:#afe6ba;"|†
| style="text-align:left;"|L.A. Lakers
| 77 || – || 38.6 || .477 || – || .814 || 4.2 ||style="background:#cfecec;"| 9.7* || – || – || 25.8
|-
| style="text-align:left;"| 
| style="text-align:left;"|L.A. Lakers
| 69 || – || 35.7 || .479 || – || .805 || 4.2 || 8.8 || – || – || 22.8
|-
| style="text-align:left;"| 
| style="text-align:left;"|L.A. Lakers
| 31 || – || 31.2 || .447 || – || .833 || 3.7 || 6.6 || 2.6 || .7 || 20.3
|- class="sortbottom"
| style="text-align:center;" colspan="2"| Career
| 932 || – || 39.2 || .474 || – || .814 || 5.8 || 6.7 || 2.6 || .7 || 27.0
|- class="sortbottom"
| style="text-align:center;" colspan="2"| All-Star
| 12 || 11 || 28.4 || .453 || – || .720 || 3.9 || 4.6 || – || – || 13.3

Playoffs 

|-
|style="text-align:left;"|1961
|style="text-align:left;"|L.A. Lakers
|12||–||38.4||.490||–||.726||8.7||5.3||–||–||22.9
|-
|style="text-align:left;"|1962
|style="text-align:left;"|L.A. Lakers
|13||–||42.8||.465||–||.807||6.8||4.4||–||–||31.5
|-
|style="text-align:left;"|1963
|style="text-align:left;"|L.A. Lakers
|13||–||41.4||.503||–||.740||8.2||4.7||–||–||27.8
|-
|style="text-align:left;"|1964
|style="text-align:left;"|L.A. Lakers
|5||–||41.2||.496||–||.792||7.2||3.4||–||–||31.2
|-
|style="text-align:left;"|1965
|style="text-align:left;"|L.A. Lakers
|11||–||42.7||.442||–||.890||5.7||5.3||–||–||40.6
|-
|style="text-align:left;"|1966
|style="text-align:left;"|L.A. Lakers
|14||–||44.2||.518||–||.872||6.3||5.6||–||–||34.2
|-
|style="text-align:left;"|1967
|style="text-align:left;"|L.A. Lakers
|1||–||1.0||–||–||–||1.0||0.0||–||–||0.0
|-
|style="text-align:left;"|1968
|style="text-align:left;"|L.A. Lakers
|15||–||41.5||.527||–||.781||5.4||5.5||–||–||30.8
|-
|style="text-align:left;"|1969
|style="text-align:left;"|L.A. Lakers
|18||–||42.1||.463||–||.804||3.9||7.5||–||–||30.9
|-
|style="text-align:left;"|1970
|style="text-align:left;"|L.A. Lakers
|18||–||46.1||.469||–||.802||3.7||8.4||–||–||31.2
|-
| style="text-align:left;background:#afe6ba;"|1972†
|style="text-align:left;"|L.A. Lakers
|15||–||40.5||.376||–||.830||4.9||8.9||–||–||22.9
|-
|style="text-align:left;"|1973
|style="text-align:left;"|L.A. Lakers
|17||–||37.5||.449||–||.780||4.5||7.8||–||–||23.6
|-
|style="text-align:left;"|1974
|style="text-align:left;"|L.A. Lakers
|1||–||14.0||.222||–||–||2.0||1.0||0.0||0.0||4.0
|- class="sortbottom"
| style="text-align:center;" colspan="2"| Career
| 153 || – || 41.3 || .469 || – || .805 || 5.6 || 6.3 || 0.0 || 0.0 || 29.1

Head coaching record

|-
| align="left" |L.A. Lakers
| align="left" |
|82||53||29|||| align="center" |1st in Pacific||17||9||8||
| align="center" |Lost in Conference Finals
|-
| align="left" |L.A. Lakers
| align="left" |
|82||45||37|||| align="center" |4th in Pacific||3||1||2||
| align="center" |Lost in Conference Semifinals
|-
| align="left" |L.A. Lakers
| align="left" |
|82||47||35|||| align="center" |3rd in Pacific||8||3||5||
| align="center" |Lost in Conference Semifinals
|-class="sortbottom"
| align="left" |Career
| ||246||145||101|||| ||22||8||14||||

Player profile 
West was an all-around combo guard who could take the playmaking roles of a point guard and score like a shooting guard, while being equally strong on offense and defense. He had a jump shot with a release the NBA lauded as "lightning quick", and was known for making baskets late in the game, earning him the nickname "Mr. Clutch". Having played forward early in his career, West was also a capable rebounder, and gifted with long arms, quick hands, and strong defensive instincts, West was also once described as one of the best ballhawks, man-to-man defenders and shot blockers among NBA guards: when the All-Defensive Teams were introduced in 1969, West made every one of them until his career ended in 1974. "He stole more than anybody, although they didn't keep records on it then", said Sharman. However, contemporaries were most impressed by West's work ethic, obsessively practicing and shooting and rarely being satisfied with himself.

West's all-round game and attitude is maybe best expressed in his statistically most spectacular game: he once was credited with 44 points (16 of 17 shots from the field, 12 of 12 free throw attempts) with 12 rebounds, 12  assists, and (unofficially counted) 10 blocked shots, thus scoring a non-official ultra-rare quadruple double. Instead of being proud, West merely commented: "Defensively, from a team standpoint, I didn't feel I played very well. Very rarely was I satisfied with how I played."

Legacy 

West ended his playing career with 14 All-Star, 12 All-NBA Team and five All-Defensive Team selections, and scored 25,192 points, 6,238 assists and 5,366 rebounds in 932 games, translating to an average of 27.0 points, 6.7 assists and 5.8 rebounds per game. Among retired players, only Michael Jordan, Elgin Baylor and Wilt Chamberlain surpass his 27.0 points per game average. He led the Lakers in scoring in seven seasons, and only Jordan had a higher career scoring average in the playoffs (33.5 versus 29.1). In 1979, West was elected into the Naismith Memorial Basketball Hall of Fame, and the Lakers retired his No. 44 jersey in 1983. In March 2008, ESPN voted West the third greatest shooting guard of all time. In 2022, to commemorate the NBA's 75th Anniversary The Athletic ranked their top 75 players of all time, and named West as the 14th greatest player in NBA history. As a coach, West led the Lakers into three consecutive playoff campaigns, and then went on to win seven NBA championships as a general manager, building the 1980s Lakers dynasty under coach Pat Riley and players Magic Johnson, Kareem Abdul-Jabbar, and James Worthy and the 2000s under coach Phil Jackson and players Shaquille O'Neal and Kobe Bryant.

In the summer of 2000, the city of Morgantown, West Virginia, and West Virginia Governor Cecil Underwood, dedicated the road outside of the West Virginia University Coliseum, "Jerry West Boulevard". The same road is shared on the south end of Morgantown with Don Knotts Boulevard, in honor of another WVU alumnus. Also, on November 26, 2005, his number 44 became the first basketball number to be retired by West Virginia University and on February 17, 2007, a bronze statue created by sculptor Jamie Lester was installed outside of the WVU Coliseum. On February 17, 2011, a statue of West was unveiled outside Staples Center at the Star Plaza in Los Angeles, California. Finally, the NBA logo itself is modeled after West's silhouette. On June 1, 2019, President Donald Trump announced West would receive the Presidential Medal of Freedom.

Personal life

West married his college sweetheart Martha Jane Kane in April 1960 in Morgantown; they divorced in 1976. They have three sons, David, Mark and Michael. 

Jerry married his current wife, Kristine "Karen" Bua, in 1978. They have two sons, Ryan and Jonnie. Jonnie played guard for West's college team, the West Virginia Mountaineers and married professional golfer Michelle Wie in 2019.

As a person, West was often described as an introverted and nervous character, but who also drew the highest praise for his uncompromising work ethic. Regarding his shyness, WVU roommate Jody Gardner testified that West never dated in his entire freshman year, and Lakers coach Fred Schaus once recalled two weeks when his guard never said a word. Apart from being shy, West was always restless: Schaus described him as a "bundle of nerves", Celtics contemporary Bob Cousy as "always on the move", and fellow Laker and Mountaineer Rod Hundley testified that during bar visits, West would quickly squirm and demand to go elsewhere before everybody else had settled. His first wife Martha Kane recalled that her husband often had difficulties opening up to her. After a big loss, the Wests would drive home and she would try to console him, but West would say "get out" at the home porch and drive away—an experience that "killed" her as a wife.

Early in his career, West's West Virginian roots made him a target for some mild jeering. He spoke with a high pitched voice that became even shriller when he became excited so that Lakers captain Elgin Baylor dubbed West "Tweety Bird". His Appalachian accent was so thick that one coach interrupted him and asked him to speak English. Baylor once commented: "Rumors are safe with you, Tweety Bird. You pass them on, but nobody can understand you."

West was also regarded for his extreme mental toughness and his exemplary work ethic. The NBA described West as "obsessive perfectionism, unabashed confidence, and an uncompromising will to win... a level of intensity so high it could melt lead". Lakers broadcaster Chick Hearn once said: "He took a loss harder than any player I've ever known. He would sit by himself and stare into space. A loss just ripped his guts out." Even before his sole championship in 1972, the Lakers held a "Jerry West Night", and eleven-time NBA champion and perennial rival Bill Russell appeared and said: "Jerry, you are, in every sense of the word, truly a champion... If I could have one wish granted, it would be that you would always be happy."

In 2011, West and bestselling author Jonathan Coleman wrote a memoir entitled West by West: My Charmed, Tormented Life. The book has had tremendous critical acclaim and became an instant  New York Times bestseller. During an interview on HBO's Real Sports with Bryant Gumbel, West revealed that as a child he was the victim of physical abuse from his father and has suffered from depression ever since.

West is portrayed in the 2022 HBO docudrama series Winning Time: The Rise of the Lakers Dynasty as a temperamental, foul-mouthed executive prone to angry outbursts and mood swings. On April 19, 2022, West demanded a retraction from the network within two weeks for the  "cruel" and "deliberately false" depiction, as played by actor Jason Clarke.

See also

List of National Basketball Association career scoring leaders
List of National Basketball Association career assists leaders
List of National Basketball Association career free throw scoring leaders
List of National Basketball Association career playoff scoring leaders
List of National Basketball Association career playoff assists leaders
List of National Basketball Association career playoff free throw scoring leaders
List of National Basketball Association annual scoring leaders
List of National Basketball Association players with most points in a game
List of National Basketball Association players with most assists in a game
List of National Basketball Association players with most steals in a game
List of National Basketball Association single-game playoff scoring leaders
List of NCAA Division I men's basketball players with 2000 points and 1000 rebounds
List of NBA players who have spent their entire career with one franchise

Footnotes

Notes

References

External links

 Jerry West at nba.com
 
 Jerry West Digital Collection at the West Virginia & Regional History Center
  Career Statistics (coach)
 Statistics (college)

1938 births
Living people
All-American college men's basketball players
American basketball scouts
American men's basketball players
Basketball players at the 1959 Pan American Games
Basketball players at the 1960 Summer Olympics
Basketball players from West Virginia
Golden State Warriors executives
Los Angeles Lakers executives
Los Angeles Lakers head coaches
Los Angeles Lakers players
Los Angeles Lakers scouts
Medalists at the 1959 Pan American Games
Medalists at the 1960 Summer Olympics
Memphis Grizzlies executives
Minneapolis Lakers draft picks
Naismith Memorial Basketball Hall of Fame inductees
National Basketball Association All-Stars
National Basketball Association broadcasters
National Basketball Association general managers
National Basketball Association players with retired numbers
National Collegiate Basketball Hall of Fame inductees
Olympic gold medalists for the United States in basketball
Pan American Games gold medalists for the United States
Pan American Games medalists in basketball
People from Kanawha County, West Virginia
Point guards
Presidential Medal of Freedom recipients
Shooting guards
United States men's national basketball team players
West Virginia Mountaineers men's basketball players